Since Canadian Confederation in 1867, there have been several proposals for new Canadian provinces and territories. Since 1982, the current Constitution of Canada requires an amendment ratified by seven provincial legislatures representing at least half of the national population for the creation of a new province while the creation of a new territory requires only an act of Parliament. Because opening up the constitution to amendment could entice provinces to demand other changes too in exchange for such support, this is seen to be a politically unfeasible option. The newest province, Newfoundland and Labrador, joined Canada in 1949 by an act of the British Parliament before the 1982 patriation of the constitution.

Movements within Canada

There have been movements to create new provinces and territories within the borders of Canada. In late 2004, Prime Minister Paul Martin surprised some observers by expressing his personal support for all three territories "eventually" gaining provincial status. He cited their importance to the country as a whole and the ongoing need to assert  sovereignty in the Arctic, particularly since global warming could make that region more open to exploitation and lead to more complex international waters disputes.

Movements outside Canada

British overseas territories
In 1905, Ian Malcolm suggested in the British House of Commons that the United Kingdom might benefit from transferring one or more isles of the West Indies to Canada for national defence.

In 1919, Canadian Prime Minister Robert Borden and his delegation to the Paris Peace Conference discussed transferring parts of the West Indies as territories, sub-dominions, or League of Nations mandates, including the possibility of exchanging some to the United States for the Alaska Panhandle.

Current British overseas territories

Former British overseas territories

Former British territories have expressed interest in joining Canada:

United States

European outer regions

Europe

Other
Two small border exclaves of the United States have also been the subject of proposals to secede from the United States and join Canada. Neither would become its own standalone province or territory if it joined Canada, however, but rather both would simply be added to the existing provinces that they adjoin.

Sources 
 Carmichael, Dr. Trevor A. 2001. Passport to the Heart: Reflections on Canada Caribbean Relations. Ian Randle Publishers, Kingston 6, Jamaica. , forward, synopsis

See also

 51st state
 Alberta separatism
 Former colonies and territories in Canada
 Inuit Nunangat
 Quebec sovereignty movement
 Territorial evolution of Canada – after 1867
 Western alienation in Canada
 Potential Canadian EU membership
 Cascadian independence movement

References

Lists of proposals
Canada